Armel Dagrou Jr. (born 16 March 1992) is a soccer player who plays as a forward. Born in Canada, he represented Burundi internationally.

Early life
Dagrou was born in Montreal, Quebec, to a Burundian mother and an Ivorian father. He lived in France, Belgium, and the Ivory Coast before settling in Gatineau when he was 16 years old.

He helped the Quebec team win gold at the 2009 Canada Games. In 2010, he joined the Montreal Impact Academy. In 2011, he was part of the Quebec U23 team that played a friendly against French club FC Metz U19.

University career
Dagrou initially attended the University of Montreal, playing for the Carabins. In 2013, he switched to the Université du Québec à Montréal. In 2014, he was named a CIS first-team all-star as well as RSEQ MVP.

Club career
In 2012, Dagrou played for FC Brossard in the Première ligue de soccer du Québec.

In 2013, he joined new PLSQ side CS Mont-Royal Outremont. He won two PLSQ titles with Mont-Royal in 2013 and 2015. In 2015, Mont-Royal participated in the Inter-Provincial Cup against League1 Ontario champions Oakville Blue Devils FC, with Dagrou scoring in the first leg.

In 2015, he went on trial with Swedish club IFK Luleå.

In 2016, he moved to AS Blainville.

In 2021, he played with Boucherville in the amateur Ligue de soccer élite du Québec, winning the men's AAA title and was the league's top scorer.

International career
In 2014, he was invited to take part in the 2015 Africa Cup of Nations qualification with the Burundi national team, after he took videos to the national team coach. He made his debut on 1 June 2014, against Botswana in a 1–0 defeat.

References

External links

1992 births
Living people
Canadian people of Burundian descent
Canadian people of Ivorian descent
Burundian footballers
Association football forwards
Burundi international footballers
Première ligue de soccer du Québec players
Soccer players from Montreal
Université de Montréal alumni
Université du Québec à Montréal alumni
FC Brossard players
A.S. Blainville players
CS Mont-Royal Outremont players